Takashinga Cricket Club is a cricket club in Highfield, Harare. Some of its famous members include Andy Flower and Tatenda Taibu. The club's ground is located at the Zimbabwe grounds in the Highfield. As of 2007-08, it is one of the strongest cricket clubs in Zimbabwe.

The club was created in 1990 when Givemore Makoni and Stephen Mangongo decided they wanted to start a cricket club. The two looked for a place to call home, when after a long search, Churchill High School offered their facilities. Part of the arrangement, was that the club would be called Old Winstonians. Some say that Andy Flower and his father, Bill, started Takashinga.

In 2001, the name was changed from Old Winstonians to Takashinga. By that point, a home base had been set up in the Highfields. Givemore Makoni told Cricinfo, "We have changed the name to identify with ourselves and our community. We are a black club, and 'Winstonians' does not identify with us in any way. 'Takashinga' means we are brave and we will fight all the way. This symbolizes the black people of Zimbabwe who are no quitters at anything they set their mind on."

References 

Cricket grounds in Zimbabwe
Buildings and structures in Harare